Balázs Gőz; born 3 August 1992 in Miskolc) is a Hungarian professional ice hockey defenceman who plays for DVTK Jegesmedvék in the Slovak Extraliga.

External links

1992 births
Living people
DVTK Jegesmedvék players
HC Morzine-Avoriaz players
Hungarian ice hockey defencemen
Norfolk Admirals (ECHL) players
Sportspeople from Miskolc
Roanoke Rail Yard Dawgs players